Cuitlatec, or Cuitlateco, is an extinct language of Mexico, formerly spoken by an indigenous people known as Cuitlatec.

Classification
Cuitlatec has not been convincingly classified as belonging to any language family.  It is believed to be a language isolate.  In their controversial classification of the indigenous languages of the Americas, Greenberg and Ruhlen include Cuitlatec in an expanded Chibchan language family (Macro-Chibchan), along with a variety of other Mesoamerican and South American languages.  Escalante Hernández suggests a possible relation to the Uto-Aztecan languages.

Geographic distribution
Cuitlatec was spoken in the state of Guerrero.  By the 1930s, Cuitlatec was spoken only in San Miguel Totolapan. The last speaker of the language, Juana Can, is believed to have died in the 1960s. In 1979, only two elderly women, Florentina Celso and Apolonia Robles, were able to remember about fifty words of the language.

Phonology

Consonants

Vowels

Grammar
Sentences generally follow SVO word order.  Adjectives precede the nouns they modify.

References

Bibliography
 Susana Drucker, Roberto Escalante, & Roberto J. Weitlaner. 1969. The Cuitlatec. In Evon Z. Vogt, ed., Handbook of Middle American Indians, Ethnology: Vol 7, Chapter 30. University of Texas Press, Austin: 565-575
 McQuown, Norman A. 1945. Fonémica del Cuitlateco. El México Antiguo 5: 239-254.
 Weitlaner, Roberto J. 1939. Notes on the Cuitlatec language. El México Antiguo 4: 363-373.

External links

Cuitlatec word list on Wiktionary

Mesoamerican languages
Extinct languages of North America
Indigenous languages of Mexico
Language isolates of North America
Subject–object–verb languages
Languages extinct in the 1960s
Guerrero